Four vessels of the Royal Navy have been named HMS Seaflower:

 HMS Seaflower was a 16-gun brig-sloop listed in 1809, and sold on 1 September 1814. 
  was a 4 gun cutter launched at Portsmouth Dockyard on 20 May 1830 and broken up at Charlton, scrapping completed on 8 October 1866.
  was an 8 gun training brig, launched at Pembroke Dockyard on 25 February 1873. Converted to a floating workship in January 1904, the ship was sold at Charlton on 7 April 1908.

References
 

Royal Navy ship names